Rosersberg is a locality situated in Sigtuna Municipality, Stockholm County, Sweden with 1,671 inhabitants in 2010.

It grew up around a railway station and got its name from the nearby Rosersberg Palace, one of the royal palaces of Sweden. Rosersberg has a station of the Stockholm commuter rail system.

References 

Populated places in Sigtuna Municipality
Metropolitan Stockholm
Sigtuna Municipality